Rufino Blanco Fombona (1874–1944) was a Venezuelan literary historian and man of letters who played a major role in bringing the works of Latin American writers to world attention. He is buried in the National Pantheon of Venezuela. He was nominated for the Nobel Prize in Literature six times.

Works 
 1899: Trovadores y trovas
 1900: Cuentos de poeta
 1904: Cuentos americanos
 1907: El hombre de hierro
 1911: Cantos de la prisión y del destierro
 1915: El hombre de oro
 1917: Grandes escritores de América
 1921: El conquistador español del siglo XVI
 1927: La mitra en la mano
 1931: La bella y la fiera
 1933: Camino de imperfección

References

People from Caracas

Venezuelan male writers
Male novelists
Ambassadors of Venezuela to Uruguay
1874 births
1944 deaths
Burials at the National Pantheon of Venezuela
20th-century Venezuelan novelists
Prisoners and detainees of Venezuela